Hohenwestedt-Land is a former Amt ("collective municipality") in the district of Rendsburg-Eckernförde, in Schleswig-Holstein, Germany. It was situated around the town Hohenwestedt, which was the seat of the Amt, but not part of it. Since January 2007 Hohenwestedt-Land formed the Verwaltungsgemeinschaft Mittelholstein together with the Amt Aukrug, Amt Hanerau-Hademarschen and Hohenwestedt itself. Mittelholstein became an Amt on 1 January 2012, and the Amt Hohenwestedt-Land was disbanded.

Subdivision
The Amt Hohenwestedt-Land consisted of the following municipalities:

Beringstedt 
Grauel 
Heinkenborstel 
Jahrsdorf 
Meezen 
Mörel 
Nienborstel 
Nindorf 
Osterstedt 
Rade bei Hohenwestedt 
Remmels 
Tappendorf 
Todenbüttel 
Wapelfeld

References

External links
 Hohenwestedt-Land official site

Former Ämter in Schleswig-Holstein